The Schmittentobel Viaduct is a single track limestone railway viaduct.  It is situated near Schmitten, in the Canton of Graubünden, Switzerland.

The viaduct was opened in 1903 by the Rhaetian Railway, which still owns and uses it today.

Location

The Schmittentobel Viaduct forms part of the Albula Railway section between Tiefencastel and Filisur.

Within sight of the Schmittentobel Viaduct, a little further along the line towards Filisur, is the much better known Landwasser Viaduct, which is one of the signature structures of the Albula Railway, and indeed the whole Rhaetian Railway.

Technical data

See also

Glacier Express
Bernina Express
Filisur (Rhaetian Railway station)

References

Belloncle, Patrick, Le chemin de fer Rhétique, 1889-1999, Les Editions du Cabri, Switzerland,

External links

 
 

Viaducts in Switzerland
Rhaetian Railway bridges
Buildings and structures in Graubünden
Bridges completed in 1903
Stone arch bridges
Schmitten, Graubünden
20th-century architecture in Switzerland